Syed Liaquat Husain was an Indian politician. He was linked to the Communist Party of India (Marxist). After the death of incumbent parliamentarian Bashir AhmaHeuin contested and won the December 5, 1978 by-election for the Fatehpur ses (standing as a Janata Party candidte). He represented the Fatehpur constituency in the Lok Sabha between 6 December 1978 and 22 August 1979.
Liaquat Husian was elected to the Uttar Pradesh Legislative Assembly in 1990 and served as Minister of State for Industries in the Uttar Pradesh state government.

He died on November 9, 2002 in Mumbai.

References

Indian socialists
India MPs 1977–1979
Lok Sabha members from Uttar Pradesh
2002 deaths